Catch-22 is a 1970 American satirical black comedy war film adapted from the 1961 novel of the same name by Joseph Heller. In creating a black comedy revolving around the "lunatic characters" of Heller's satirical anti-war novel set at a fictional Mediterranean base during World War II, director Mike Nichols and screenwriter Buck Henry (also in the cast) worked on the film script for two years, converting Heller's complex novel to the medium of film.

The cast included Alan Arkin, Bob Balaban, Martin Balsam, Richard Benjamin, Italian actress Olimpia Carlisi, French comedian Marcel Dalio, Art Garfunkel (his acting debut), Jack Gilford, Charles Grodin, Bob Newhart, Anthony Perkins, Austin Pendleton, Paula Prentiss, Martin Sheen, Jon Voight, and Orson Welles.

Plot

Captain John Yossarian, a U.S. Army Air Force B-25 bombardier, is stationed on the Mediterranean base on Pianosa during World War II. Along with his squadron members, Yossarian is committed to flying dangerous missions, but after watching friends die, he seeks a means of escape.

While most crews are rotated out after twenty-five missions, his commanding officer, Colonel Cathcart keeps raising the minimum number of missions for this base before anyone can reach it, eventually to an unobtainable eighty missions; a figure resulting from Cathcart's craving for publicity, primarily a mention in the nationally syndicated Saturday Evening Post magazine.

Futilely appealing to Cathcart, Yossarian learns that even a mental breakdown is no release when Doc Daneeka explains the "Catch-22" the Army Air Force employs: An airman would have to be crazy to fly more missions, and if he were crazy, he would be unfit to fly. Yet, if an airman were to refuse to fly more missions, this would indicate that he is sane, which would mean that he would be fit to fly the missions, basically an impossible "damned if you do, damned if you don't" situation.

Yossarian is haunted, in several recurring flashbacks during the film, by the bloody death of Snowden, the young turret gunner on his B-25. After Snowden's death, Yossarian temporarily refuses to wear his uniform, which Snowden bled on. He shows up at a medal ceremony naked, and later morosely sits naked in a tree, where he is visited by Lt. Milo Minderbinder, who rapidly progresses from squadron supply officer to a capitalistic tycoon involved in black-market money-making schemes. The bomber squadron is populated by many additional comically strange characters. Major Major Major, the squadron's operations officer, is promoted to a squadron commander without ever having flown in a plane, and refuses to see anyone in his office while he is in, instructing Sergeant Towser that people can see him when he's out. The person had to wait in the waiting room until Major Major Major was gone, then the visitor could go right in.

Trapped by this convoluted logic, Yossarian watches as individuals in the squadron resort to unusual means to cope; Lt. Milo Minderbinder concocts elaborate black market schemes while crazed Captain "Aarfy" Aardvark commits murder to silence a girl he raped. Lieutenant Nately falls for a prostitute, Major Danby delivers goofy pep talks before every bomb run and Captain Orr keeps crashing at sea. Meanwhile, Nurse Duckett occasionally beds Yossarian.

Nately dies as a result of an agreement between Milo and the Germans, trading surplus cotton in exchange for the squadron bombing its own base. While on a pass, Yossarian shares this news with Captain Nately's Whore, who then tries to kill him.

Because of Yossarian's constant complaints, Cathcart and Lt. Colonel Korn eventually agree to send him home, promising him a promotion to major and awarding him a medal for the fictitious saving of Cathcart's life; the only requirement being that Yossarian agrees to "like" the Colonels and praise them when he gets home.

Immediately after agreeing to Cathcart's and Korn's plan, Yossarian survives an attempt on his life when stabbed by Nately's Whore, who had disguised herself as a janitor. Once recovered, Yossarian learns from the chaplain and Major Danby that Captain Orr's supposed death was a hoax and that Orr's repeated "crash" landings had been a subterfuge for practicing and planning his own escape from the madness. Yossarian is informed that Orr ditched the plane and paddled a rescue raft all the way to Sweden on his last run.

Yossarian decides to ditch the deal with Cathcart, leaps out of the hospital window, takes a raft from a damaged plane and, while a marching band practices for the ceremony to award Yossarian the promotion and medal, he hops into the sea, climbs into the raft and starts paddling.

Cast

Main cast (as appearing in screen credits):

 Alan Arkin as Captain John Yossarian (Bombardier)
 Bob Balaban as Captain Orr (Bomber Pilot)
 Martin Balsam as Colonel Chuck Cathcart (Group Commander, 256th Bomb Group)
 Richard Benjamin as Major Danby (Group Operations Officer)
 Susanne Benton as Dreedle's WAC
 Marcel Dalio as Old Man in Whorehouse
 Norman Fell as First Sgt. Towser (Major Major's Desk Clerk, later Acting Squadron Commander)
 Art Garfunkel (billed Arthur Garfunkel) as Lt. Edward J. Nately III (Pilot)
 Jack Gilford as Dr. "Doc" Daneeka (Group Flight Surgeon)
 Charles Grodin as Captain "Aarfy" Aardvark (Navigator)
 Buck Henry as Lt. Colonel Korn (Group XO / Roman policeman)
 Bob Newhart as Captain/Major Major (Laundry Officer, later Squadron Commander)
 Austin Pendleton as Lt. Col. Moodus
 Anthony Perkins as Capt. Fr. Albert Taylor "A. T." Tappman (Chaplain)
 Paula Prentiss as Nurse Duckett (Army Medical Nurse Corps)
 Martin Sheen as 1st Lt. Dobbs (Pilot)
 Jon Voight as 1st Lt. Milo Minderbinder (Mess Officer)
 Orson Welles as Brigadier General Dreedle (Wing Commander)

Production

Adaptation
The adaptation changed the book's plot. Several story arcs are left out, and many characters in the movie speak dialogue and experience events of other characters in the book. Despite the changes in the screenplay, Heller approved of the film, according to a commentary by Nichols and Steven Soderbergh included on a DVD release. According to Nichols, Heller was particularly impressed with a few scenes and bits of dialogue Henry created for the film, and said he wished he could have included them in the novel.

The pacing of the novel Catch-22 is frenetic, its tenor intellectual, and its tone largely absurdist, interspersed with brief moments of gritty, almost horrific, realism. The novel did not follow a normal chronological progression; rather, it was told as a series of different and often (seemingly, until later) unrelated events, most from the point of view of the central character Yossarian. The film simplified the plot.

Aircraft

Paramount assigned a $17 million budget to the production and planned to film key flying scenes for six weeks, but the aerial sequences required six months of camera work, resulting in the bombers flying about 1,500 hours. They appear on screen for approximately 10 minutes.

Catch-22 is renowned for its role in saving the B-25 Mitchell aircraft from possible extinction. The film's budget accommodated 17 flyable B-25 Mitchells, and one hulk was acquired in Mexico, and flown with landing gear down to the Guaymas, Sonora, Mexico filming location. The aircraft was burned and destroyed in the crash landing scene. The wreck was then buried in the ground by the runway, where it remains.

For the film, prop upper turrets were installed, and to represent different models, several aircraft had turrets installed behind the wings representing early (B-25C/D type) aircraft. Initially, the camera ships also had mock turrets installed, but problems with buffeting necessitated their removal.

Many of the "Tallmantz Air Force fleet" went on to careers in films and television, before being sold as surplus. Fifteen of the 18 bombers remain intact, including one displayed at the Smithsonian Institution's National Air and Space Museum.

Death on the set
Second unit director John Jordan refused to wear a harness during a bomber scene and fell out of the open tail turret  to his death.

Release
A half-hour preview of the film was held at the San Francisco International Film Festival on October 31, 1969.

The film had premieres on June 24, 1970, in New York, Chicago, Washington D.C. and Toronto.

Home media
Catch-22 was released for home viewing on VHS and Beta in 1979, Laserdisc in 1982, and SelectaVision CED disc. Some of the music was changed for the 1992 VHS Hi-Fi re-release.

Catch-22 was re-released to DVD by Paramount Home Video on May 21, 2013; a previous version was released on May 11, 2001. The DVD contains commentary by director Mike Nichols moderated by Steven Soderbergh.

Reception

Critical reaction
 

Vincent Canby of The New York Times praised the film as "the most moving, the most intelligent, the most humane--oh, to hell with it!--it's the best American film I've seen this year." He felt the film was "complete and consistent", and commended its balance of comedy and seriousness as well as the ensemble cast. In a cover story about Mike Nichols, Time wrote "It is the book's cold rage that he has nurtured. In the jokes that matter, the film is as hard as a diamond, cold to the touch and brilliant to the eye. To Nichols, Catch-22 is 'about dying'; to Arkin, it is 'about selfishness'; to audiences, it will be a memorable horror comedy of war, with the accent on horror." Roger Ebert of the Chicago Sun-Times gave the film 3 stars out of 4, calling it "a disappointment, and not simply because it fails to do justice to the Heller novel." He noted that the film "recites speeches and passages from the novel, but doesn't explain them or make them part of its style. No, Nichols avoids those hard things altogether, and tries to distract us with razzle-dazzle while he sneaks in a couple of easy messages instead." Similarly, Gene Siskel for the Chicago Tribune gave the film  stars out of four arguing the film "spends too much time accommodating a huge cast", and instead the film should have properly focused on "Yossarian's combat, with the catch into his head where it belongs". Nevertheless, he wrote "The film's technical credits, photography, and special effects are uniformly outstanding. Of the huge supporting cast, Dick Benjamin, Bob Newhart, and Jack Gilford are the best." Charles Champlin, reviewing for the Los Angeles Times, felt "The movie is never again quite so fine. Catch-22 is awfully good, and also a disappointment: Chilly brilliant at its best but flawed at last by its detachment and by its failure to catch fire and give off heat. Its fury is cold and intellectual and cannot reach us or involve us at gut level."

Box office 
Upon the initial release, Catch-22 earned US$24.9 million out of the budget of US$18 million. It was director Mike Nichols' third film, after the acclaimed Who's Afraid of Virginia Woolf? and The Graduate. It was not regarded as a comparable success, earning less money and critical acclaim than the film version of MASH, another war-themed black comedy released earlier the same year. In addition, some critics believed that the film appeared as Americans were becoming more resentful of the bitter and ugly experience of the Vietnam War, leading to a general decline in the interest of war pictures, with the notable exceptions of MASH and Patton. Critic Lucia Bozzola wrote "Paramount spent a great deal of money on Catch-22, but it wound up getting trumped by another 1970 antiwar farce: Robert Altman's MASH." Film historians and reviewers Jack Harwick and Ed Schnepf characterized it as deeply flawed, noting that Henry's screenplay was disjointed and that the only redeeming features were the limited aerial sequences.

Adaptations in other media
A pilot episode for a Catch-22 television series was aired on ABC in 1973, with Richard Dreyfuss in the Captain Yossarian role.

A six-part Catch 22 miniseries, produced by Hulu and Sky Italia, premiered worldwide in 2019.

There have been other films with "Catch-22" in their names, including the documentary Catch-22 (2007) and the short films Catch 22: The New Contract (2009) and Catch22 (2010), but they have been unrelated to either the book or film adaptation.

In popular culture
The anti-war song "Survivor Guilt" by punk rock band Rise Against features samples of dialog from the movie, specifically the discussion between Nately and the old man about the fall of great countries and potential fall of the US, and their argument about the phrase "It's better to live on your feet than die on your knees." The same excerpts from the film previously were used by lead singer Tim McIlrath, in the song "Burden", recorded by his former band, Baxter.

See also
 List of American films of 1970

References
Notes

Citations

Bibliography

 Bennighof, James. The Words and Music of Paul Simon. Portsmouth, New Hampshire: Greenwood Publishing Group, 2007. .
 Evans, Alun. Brassey's Guide to War Films. Dulles, Virginia: Potomac Books, 2000. .
 Farmer, James H. "The Catch-22 Air Force." Air Classics, Volume 8, No. 14, December 1972.
 Harwick, Jack and Ed Schnepf. "A Viewer's Guide to Aviation Movies". The Making of the Great Aviation Films, General Aviation Series, Volume 2, 1989.
 Nichols, Mike and Steven Soderbergh. "Commentary." Catch-22 DVD (Special Features). Los Angeles: Paramount Pictures Home Entertainment, 2001.
 Orriss, Bruce. When Hollywood Ruled the Skies: The Aviation Film Classics of World War II. Hawthorne, California: Aero Associates Inc., 1984. .
 Tallman, Frank. "The Making of Catch-22." Warbirds International, Vol. 27, no. 4, May/June 2008.
 Thegze, Chuck "I See Everything Twice": An Examination of Catch-22, University of California Press.
 Thompson, Scott A. "Hollywood Mitchells." Air Classics, Vol. 16, No. 9, September 1980.

External links

 
 
 
 
 Catch-22 camera aircraft history

 (film)
1970 films
1970s black comedy films
1970s satirical films
1970s war comedy-drama films
American aviation films
American black comedy films
American satirical films
American war comedy-drama films
Anti-war comedy films
Anti-war films about World War II
1970s English-language films
Films based on American novels
Films based on military novels
Films about the United States Army Air Forces
Films directed by Mike Nichols
Italian Campaign of World War II films
Military humor in film
Paramount Pictures films
Films with screenplays by Buck Henry
World War II aviation films
Films set in Italy
1970 comedy films
Film controversies in Portugal
1970s American films

ja:キャッチ22#映画